The 1903 Ohio Green and White football team represented University of Ohio in the 1903 college football season as an independent. Led by Fred Sullivan in his second and final year as head coach, the Green and White compiled a record of 2–5, being outscored 45–159.

Schedule

References

Ohio
Ohio Bobcats football seasons
Ohio Green and White football